The Chicago Outfit (also known as the Outfit, the Chicago Mafia, the Chicago Mob, the Chicago crime family, the South Side Gang or The Organization) is an Italian-American organized crime syndicate or crime family based in Chicago, Illinois, that originated in the city's South Side in the early 1910s. It is part of the larger Italian-American Mafia.

The Outfit rose to power in the 1920s under the control of Johnny Torrio and Al Capone, and the period was marked by bloody gang wars for control of the distribution of illegal alcohol during Prohibition. Since then, the Outfit has been involved in a wide range of criminal activities, including loansharking, illegal gambling, prostitution, extortion, political corruption and murder. Capone was convicted of income tax evasion in 1931 and the Outfit was next run by Paul Ricca. He shared power with Tony Accardo from 1943 until his death in 1972; Accardo became the sole power in the Outfit upon Ricca's death and was one of the longest sitting bosses of all time upon his death in 1992.

Though it has never had a complete monopoly on organized crime in Chicago, the Outfit has long been the most powerful, violent and largest criminal organization in Chicago and the Midwest in general. Unlike other mafia factions such as the Five Families of New York City, the Outfit has been a unified faction since its conception. Its influence at its peak stretched as far as California, Florida and Nevada and it continues to operate throughout the Midwestern United States and Southern Florida, as well as Las Vegas and other parts of the Southwestern United States. Heightened law enforcement attention and general attrition have led to its gradual decline since the late 20th century, though it continues to be one of the major and most active organized crime groups in the Chicago metropolitan area and the Midwestern region.

History

Origins
The early years of organized crime in Chicago, in the late 19th and early 20th centuries, were marked by the division of various street gangs controlling the South Side and North Side, as well as the Black Hand organizations of Little Italy. In later years, the Outfit consisted of various street crews controlling different territories around Chicago including Elmwood Park, Melrose Park, Chicago Heights, Rush Street, Grand Avenue and Chinatown.

Big Jim Colosimo centralized control in the early 20th century. Colosimo was born in Calabria, Italy, in 1878, immigrated to Chicago in 1895, where he established himself as a criminal. By 1909, with the help of bringing Johnny Torrio from New York to Chicago, he was successful enough that he was encroaching on the criminal activity of the Black Hand organization. Colosimo, also “cultivated deep political connections'' after “serving as a precinct captain in the organization of First Ward Alderman Couglin and Kenna, and later [became] the bagman (collector of illegal profits and dispenser of bribes) in the vice-laden Levee District, which afforded him with blanket political protection”.

Prohibition and Al Capone
In 1919, Capone also left New York for Chicago at the invitation of Torrio. Capone began in Chicago as a bouncer in a brothel, where he contracted syphilis. Timely use of Salvarsan probably could have cured the infection, but he apparently never sought treatment.

When Prohibition went into effect in 1920, Torrio pushed for the gang to enter into bootlegging, but Colosimo stubbornly refused. In March 1920, Colosimo secured an uncontested divorce from his wife, and Torrio's cousin, Victoria Moresco. A month later, he and singer Dale Winter eloped to West Baden Springs, Indiana. Upon their return, he bought a home on the South Side. On May 11, 1920, Torrio called and told Colosimo that a shipment was about to arrive at his restaurant. Colosimo drove there to await it, but instead, he was ambushed and shot to death.

With the start of Prohibition in the United States, new Outfit boss Torrio and his underboss Al Capone saw an opportunity for the Outfit in Chicago to make money and to further expand their criminal empire by racketeering small businesses. With Capone taking the role of an actual businessman and partner of the owner, the Outfit had a legitimate way to source their money, which prevented incrimination and unnecessary attention from law enforcement.

Torrio headed an essentially Italian organized crime group that was the biggest in the city, with Capone as his right-hand man. He was wary of being drawn into gang wars and tried to negotiate agreements over territory between rival crime groups. The smaller North Side Gang led by Dean O'Banion (also known as Dion O'Banion) was of mixed ethnicity, and it came under pressure from the Genna brothers who were allied with Torrio. O'Banion found that Torrio was unhelpful with the encroachment of the Gennas into the North Side, despite his pretensions to be a settler of disputes. The "Terrible" Genna brothers, as they were known, consisted of Peter, James, Angelo, Tony, Sam and Mike "The Devil" Genna. They were known for their ruthlessness and intemperate disposition. In a fateful step, Torrio either arranged for or acquiesced to the murder of O'Banion at his flower shop on November 10, 1924. This placed Hymie Weiss at the head of the gang, backed by Vincent Drucci and Bugs Moran. Weiss had been a close friend of O'Banion and the North Siders made it a priority to get revenge on his killers.

At the end of 1924, the Torrio-Capone gang had between 300-400 members, while the North Side gang could count on around 200 soldiers.

In January 1925, Capone was ambushed, leaving him shaken but unhurt. Twelve days later, on January 24, Torrio was returning from a shopping trip with his wife Anna, when he was shot several times. After recovering, he effectively resigned and handed control to Capone, age 26, who became the new boss of an organization that took in illegal breweries and a transportation network that reached to Canada, with political and law-enforcement protection. Torrio greatly influenced modern organized crime, he retired to New York and acted as an advisor to the New York Mafia in helping form the "Commission". In turn, Capone was able to use more violence to increase revenue. An establishment that refused to purchase liquor from him often got blown up and as many as 100 people were killed in such bombings during the 1920s. 1925-1926 were the most violent years of Chicago's "Beer Wars" in which 133 gangsters were murdered. Rivals saw Capone as responsible for the proliferation of brothels in the city.

Capone was widely assumed to have been responsible for ordering the 1929 Saint Valentine's Day Massacre in an attempt to eliminate Bugs Moran, head of the North Side Gang. On that fateful and cold February morning, 4 Capone henchmen (two dressed as Chicago policemen) entered the S.M.C Cartage Company garage located at 2122 N. Clark St. Chicago, IL to find 7 men, which included 5 of Moran's soldiers, an auto mechanic and a friend of the gangsters, awaiting a shipment of highjacked booze. All 7 men were lined up against the wall in a mock police raid and shot to death. Moran escaped his fate narrowly by accidentally arriving late to the meeting. Moran was the last survivor of the North Side gunmen; his succession had come about because his similarly aggressive predecessors Vincent Drucci and Hymie Weiss had been killed in the violence that followed the murder of original leader Dean O'Banion.

Capone was convicted on three counts of income tax evasion on October 17, 1931 and was sentenced a week later to 11 years in federal prison, fined $50,000 plus $7,692 for court costs, and was held liable for $215,000 plus interest due on his back taxes. Capone later died of heart failure as a result of apoplexy on January 25, 1947.

From Nitti to Accardo

1930s–1950s
In 1931, Nitti was also convicted of tax evasion and sent to prison; however, Nitti received an 18-month sentence. When Nitti was released on March 25, 1932, he took his place as the new boss of the Capone Gang. Some revisionist historians claim that Nitti was a mere "front boss" while Paul "The Waiter" Ricca was the actual boss of the Chicago Outfit.

Over the next decade, The Outfit moved into labor racketeering, gambling, and loan sharking. Geographically, this was the period when Outfit muscle extended to Milwaukee and Madison, Wisconsin, Kansas City, and especially to Hollywood and other California cities, where The Outfit's extortion of labor unions gave it leverage over the motion picture industry.

In the early 1940s, a handful of top Outfit leaders went to prison because they were found to be extorting Hollywood by controlling the unions that compose Hollywood's movie industry, and manipulating and misusing the Teamsters Central States Pension fund.
In 1943, the Outfit was caught red-handed shaking down the Hollywood movie industry. Ricca wanted Nitti to take the fall. However, Nitti had found that he was claustrophobic, years earlier while in jail for 18 months (for tax evasion), and he decided to end his life rather than face more imprisonment for extorting Hollywood. Ricca then became the boss in name as well as in fact, with enforcement chief Tony Accardo as underboss—the start of a partnership that lasted for almost 30 years. Around this time, the Outfit began bringing in members of the Forty-Two Gang, a notoriously violent youth gang. Among them were Sam "Momo" Giancana, Sam "Mad Sam" DeStefano, Felix "Milwaukee Phil" Alderisio, and Fiore "Fifi" Buccieri.

Ricca was sent to prison later in 1943 for his part in The Outfit plot to control Hollywood. He was sentenced to 10 years in prison, along with a number of other mobsters. Through the "magic" of political connections, the whole group of Outfit mobsters was released after three years, largely due to the efforts of Outfit "fixer" Murray "The Camel" Humphreys. Ricca could not associate with mobsters as a condition of his parole. Accardo nominally took power as boss, but actually shared power with Ricca, who continued behind the scenes as a senior consultant—one of the few instances of shared power in organized crime.

Accardo joined Ricca in semi-retirement in 1957 due to some "heat" that he was getting from the IRS. From then on, Ricca and Accardo allowed several others to nominally serve as boss, such as Giancana, Alderisio, Joey Aiuppa, William "Willie Potatoes" Daddano, and Jackie "the Lackey" Cerone. Most of the front bosses originated from the Forty-Two Gang. However, no major business transactions took place without Ricca and Accardo's knowledge and approval, and certainly no "hits". By staying behind the scenes, Ricca and Accardo lasted far longer than Capone. Ricca died in 1972, leaving Accardo as the sole power behind the scenes.

1960s–1990s
During the 1960 presidential election, many claim that the Mafia, and in particular, the Chicago Outfit, boosted candidate and president John F. Kennedy. The strategy for boosting votes for Kennedy essentially ran through the mafia-controlled unions, physically threatening those who did not vote for Kennedy. It was even said that Joseph Kennedy held a meeting with mob boss Sam Giancana before the election. Supposedly the Kennedys and the Mafia agreed that if John were elected president, he would lighten the pursuit of authorities on the mob group. However, after the election, President Kennedy turned on Giancana. Theories say this is what led to his and Robert Kennedy’s assassination. Further, many believe the Outfit was involved in a Central Intelligence Agency–Mafia collusion during Castro's overthrow of the Cuban government. In exchange for its help, the Outfit was to be given access to its former casinos if it helped overthrow Fidel Castro in Operation Mongoose or Operation Family Jewels. The Outfit failed in that endeavor and faced increasing indictments under the administration of President John F. Kennedy (JFK).

The Outfit reached the height of its power in the early 1960s. Accardo used the Teamsters pension fund, with the aid of Meyer Lansky, Sidney Korshak, and Jimmy Hoffa, to engage in massive money laundering through the Outfit's casinos. The 1970s and 1980s were a hard time for the Outfit, as law enforcement continued to penetrate the organization, spurred by poll-watching politicians. Off-track betting reduced bookmaking profits, and illicit casinos withered under competition from legitimate casinos. Activities such as auto theft and professional sports betting did not replace the lost profits.

The Outfit controlled casinos in Las Vegas and "skimmed" millions of dollars over the course of several decades. Most recently, top mob figures have been found guilty of crimes dating back to as early as the mid-1960s. It has been rumored that the $2 million skimmed from the casinos in the Court case of 1986 was used to build the Old Neighborhood Italian American Club, the founder of which was Angelo J. "The Hook" LaPietra.

Allen Dorfman, a key figure in the Outfit's money embezzlement operations, was investigated by the Department of Justice. In 1982, the FBI wire-tapped Dorfman's personal and company phone lines and was able to gather the evidence needed to convict Dorfman and several of his associates on attempts to bribe a state senator to get rid of the trucking industry rates. If Dorfman succeeded, the Outfit would have seen a huge gain of profit. This was known as Operation Pendorf and was a huge blow to the Chicago crime syndicate.

Operation GAMBAT (GAMBling ATtorney) proved to be a crippling blow to the Outfit's tight grip on the Chicago political machine. Pat Marcy, a made man in the Outfit, ran the city's First Ward, which represented most of downtown Chicago. Marcy and company controlled the circuit courts from the 1950s until the late 1980s with the help of Alderman Fred Roti and Democratic Committeeman John D'Arco Sr. Together, the First Ward fixed cases involving everything from minor traffic violations to murder.

Attorney and First Ward associate Robert Cooley was one of the lawyers who represented many mafiosi and associates in which cases were fixed. As a trusted man within the First Ward, Cooley was asked to "take out" a city police officer. Cooley was also an addicted gambler and in debt, so he approached the U.S. Justice Department's Organized Crime Strike Force, declaring that he wanted to "destroy Marcy and the First Ward".

Cooley was soon in touch with the FBI and began cooperating as a federal informant. Through the years, he maintained close ties to Marcy and the big shots of the First Ward. He wore an electronic surveillance device, recording valuable conversations at the notorious "First Ward Table", located at "Counselor's Row" across the street from Chicago City Hall. The results in Operation Gambat (Gambling Attorney) were convictions of 24 corrupt judges, lawyers, and cops.

Accardo died in 1992. In a measure of how successfully he had managed to stay out of the limelight, he never spent a day in jail (or only spent one day, depending on the source) despite an arrest record dating to 1922. Chicago's transition from Accardo to the next generation of Outfit bosses has been more of an administrative change than a power struggle, distinct from the way that organized crime leadership transitions take place in New York City.

21st century

Higher law enforcement investigations and general attrition led to the Outfit's gradual decline since the late 20th century. The Old Neighborhood Italian American Club is considered to be the hangout of Old Timers as they live out their golden years. The club's founder was Angelo J. LaPietra "The Hook", who was the main Council at the time of his death in 1999.

On April 25, 2005, the U.S. Department of Justice launched Operation Family Secrets, which indicted 14 Outfit members and associates under the Racketeer Influenced and Corrupt Organizations Act (RICO), including Joseph Lombardo, Nicholas Calabrese, Frank Calabrese Sr. and James Marcello. U.S. District Court Judge James Zagel presided over the Family Secrets trial. The federal prosecutors were Mitchell A. Mars, T. Markus Funk, and John Scully. Nicholas Calabrese, facing a life sentence, became the first "made" member of the Chicago Outfit to become a witness for the federal government. Calabrese gave information on 14 murders he was personally involved with and knowledge of 22 killings during the past 30 years.

As of 2007, the Outfit's size is estimated to be 28 official members (composing its core group) and more than 100 associates.

From 1996 to 2018, the Chicago Outfit was believed to be led by John DiFronzo. As of 2021, the Chicago Outfit is believed to be led by Salvatore "Solly D" DeLaurentis.

List of Chicago Outfit related murders

Historical leadership

Bosses

Street boss
The street boss is a high-ranking member appointed to run the outfit's daily activities for the boss. The position was created to protect the boss from federal investigations.

 1996–2007: James "Jimmy the Man" Marcello – sentenced in 2007, imprisoned for life in 2009.
 2007–2012: Michael "Fat Mike" Sarno – sentenced to 25 years in prison in 2012.
 2012–2016: Louis "Louie Tomatoes" Marino
 2016–present: Albert "Albie the Falcon" Vena

Underboss
 1910–1920: John "Papa Johnny" Torrio – became boss in 1920.
 1920–1925: Alphonse "Scarface Al" Capone – became boss in 1925.
 1925–1931: Frank "The Enforcer" Nitti – became boss in 1931.
 1931–1943: Louis "Little New York" Campagna – arrested in 1943, deceased in 1955.
 1943–1947: Tony "Joe Batters" Accardo – became boss in 1947.
 1947–1957: Salvatore "Mooney Sam" Giancana – became boss in 1957, murdered in 1975.
 1957–1964: Frank "Strongy" Ferraro  – died in 1964.
 1964–1966: Samuel "Teets" Battaglia – became boss in 1966, deceased in 1973.
 1967–1986: John "Jackie the Lackey" Cerone – imprisoned in 1986, deceased in 1996.
 1986–1992: John "No Nose" DiFronzo – became boss in 1992.
 1992–1996: James "Jimmy the Man" Marcello – became street boss in 1996.
 1996–2006: Anthony "Little Tony" Zizzo – disappeared and probably murdered in 2006.
 2006–2009: Joseph "Joe the Builder" Andriacchi – retired briefly due to illness.
 2009–2020: Salvatore "Sammy Cards" Cataudella – became acting underboss
 2020–2023: James "Jimmy I" Inendino – died on February 23, 2023.
Acting 2020–2023: Salvatore "Sammy Cards" Cataudella – became official underboss
2023–present: Salvatore "Sammy Cards" Cataudella

Consigliere
 1925–1928: Antonio "Tony the Scourge" Lombardo – murdered in 1928.
 1928–1947: Charles "Trigger Happy" Fischetti – retired in 1947, deceased in 1951.
 1947–1957: Paul "The Waiter" Ricca – retired in 1957, deceased in 1972.
 1957–1992: Tony "Joe Batters" Accardo – deceased from natural causes in 1992.
 1992–1999: Angelo J. LaPietra – deceased from natural causes in 1999.
 1999–2007: Joseph "Joey the Clown" Lombardo – sentenced in 2007 and imprisoned in 2009; died on October 19, 2019, at the age of 90.
 2007–2009: Alfonso "Al the Pizza Man" Tornabene – deceased in 2009.
 2009–2020: Marco "The Mover" D'Amico – temporarily stepped down 2016 to allow Andriacchi to assist the power shift from DiFronzo to DeLaurentis, died from natural causes 2020.
 Acting 2012–2016: Joseph "Joe the Builder" Andriacchi – retired in 2016.
 2020–present: Joseph "Joe the Builder" Andriacchi

Current family members

Administration
 Boss – Salvatore "Solly D" DeLaurentis – born in 1939. Inducted in either 1988 or 1989 and put in charge of Lake County, Illinois. He was indicted in 1993 along with Ernest "Rocky" Infelice, Louis "Louie Tomatoes" Marino, Robert "Bobby The Gabeet" Bellavia, Harry Aleman, Marco "The Mover" D'Amico, and several others, in the Good Ship Lollipop Case, which centered on mob murders by the Cicero Street Crew and sent to prison for 17 years. He was released in 2007. His role in the Outfit between 2007 and 2014 when he became boss is unclear, though it is theorized that he was a co-capo of the Cicero Crew.
 Street Boss – Albert "Albie the Falcon" Vena – born in 1948. Part of the new administration following the retirement of John DiFronzo. Vena was once a powerful capo of the Grand Avenue crew and replaced Joseph Lombardo after his 2007 conviction of a 1974 murder. FBI investigators from the August 2006 disappearance case of Anthony Zizzo considered him a suspect. In 1993, Vena was acquitted of the November 4, 1992 murder of Samuel Taglia who was shot twice in the head and had his throat cut with a knife, his body was dumped in the trunk of his 1983 Buick car. His most trusted confidants were reported to be Joseph Andriacchi and James Inendino.
 Underboss – Salvatore "Sammy Cards" Cataudella – former acting underboss; convicted of racketeering related to a prostitution scheme in 1990.
 Consigliere – Joseph "Joe the Builder" Andriacchi

Capos
 Rudolph "Rudy" Fratto – Elmwood Park Crew; Peter DiFronzo was the captain before his death in December 2020. Rudy Fratto became Caporegime by 2021. Fratto was born in 1943. He was first identified as a member of the Chicago Outfit in 1997. In October 2009, he pleaded guilty to tax evasion. In September 2012, he was sentenced to 1-year imprisonment for bid-rigging $2 million in forklift contracts for a pair of trade shows at McCormick Place. Theories have arisen that he and  Michael "Mags" Magnafichi have been running the crew jointly as co-capos, though sources dispute this as Magnafichi has reportedly not been active in years.
 Frank "Toots" Caruso – 26th Street/Chinatown Crew
 Albert "Albie the Falcon" Vena – Grand Avenue Crew. By 2000, Vena had been acquitted of 2 murders. It is thought that he assumed Acting Capo status after Joey Lombardo went on the run in 2005, officially taking over sometime in 2009. 
 John "Pudgy" Matassa Jr. - Rush Street Crew. Possibly took over whatever was left of the Rush Street Crew.
 Nicholas "Jumbo" Guzzino - Chicago Heights Crew. According to Nick Calabrese he became a made man in 1983 and was sponsored by Dominick Palermo, a powerful underboss in the Chicago Heights Crew under Albert Tocco. Took over whatever remained of the old Chicago Heights Crew. It is possible and highly likely that he is retired.

Soldiers

 Anthony "Tony" Dote: In November 1994, he was indicted on charges of racketeering and illegal gambling. He pleaded guilty to the charges in 1996 and was sentenced to 4-years imprisonment.

 Joseph "Joe Kong" Cullotta: Grand Avenue crew soldier and younger brother of Frank Cullotta.
 Gary "Gags" Gagliano: Gagliano is the nephew of Joseph Gagliano, a close associate of Jackie Cerone. Gagliano is an "Outfit killer" per Joseph Fosco.
 Rocco "Rocky" Lombardo: Lombardo is the brother of Joseph Lombardo, former Chicago Outfit Consigliere. In 2007, he was sentenced to 5-years probation for tax fraud.
 Michael Carioscia: born 1933. In December 1950, he was arrested on charges of armed robbery and was sentenced to 2 years' imprisonment, he was released in 1954. He was sentenced to 5 years' imprisonment in October 1961 on narcotics charges after he and Armando Pennacchio made three sales of a large quantity of heroin to an undercover FBN officer. He has a brother named Frank.

 Paulie Carparelli high-ranking member of the 12th Street Players and possibly inducted into the Outfit's Cicero Crew
 Robert Bellavia: former member of the Ferriola crew. He was involved in the February 7, 1985 murder of bookmaker Hal C. Smith, the body was recovered 3 days later in the trunk of his car. In 1990, he was indicted and later convicted in the Good Ship Lollipop case, a large-scale racketeering and murder indictment alongside Ernest Infelice, Solly DeLaurentis, Harry Aleman, James Nicholas and William DiDomenico. He was released in 2016 after serving 25 years in prison.
 Michael "Jaws" Giorango: former associate of the Chicago Heights crew. He pleaded guilty to operating a bookmaking ring in the suburbs of South Chicago in 1989 and used threats of violence to collect unpaid debts including threats of beatings, bombings and robbery. In 1990, he was sentenced to prison and served 4 years. In 2010, reports linked him and Alexi Giannoulias, the 72nd Democratic Illinois treasurer, to a $11–20 million loan. In 2004, he was sentenced to six months of intermittent confinement and three years of probation for prostitution charges in Miami. He was granted early release from probation in 2008. In 2010, he filed for bankruptcy protection and listed assets and liabilities between $500,000 and $1 million. His case was dismissed in 2013.
 Frank Orlando: born in 1968. It was alleged he made threatening demands towards an unpaid debt of $200–500,000. At his trial, the FBI alleged Orlando introduced printing firm owner Mark Dziuban to Paul Carparelli to discuss extortion attempts. In 2014, he was sentenced to almost 4 years in prison on extortion charges.
 Nicholas "Nick" Ferriola: born in 1977. He is the son of Joseph Ferriola. He was sentenced by U.S. District Judge James Zagel in 2008 to 3 years in federal prison for his role in the Family Secrets case, he was accused of extortion and illegal sports gambling charges over an 8-year period, Ferriola admitted to earning over $150,000 per month. He served as a trusted confidant to Frank Calabrese Sr. during the operation including after Calabrese's life imprisonment sentence in 2009.
 Tony Saviano: Saviano was involved in an Outfit gambling operation during the 1980s. Pete Rose placed bets with his organization when in Chicago. Authorities speculate that his nephew Tony Saviano out of West Chicago had great influence in the operation.
 Sam Sei: Sei and his nephew Keith had great influence in Melrose Park, Illinois and controlled the town during the 1990's.
 Robert Panozzo: Panozzo is a former member of the C-Notes street gang and soldier of the Grand Avenue crew. He was sentenced to 18 years on state racketeering charges on January 8, 2019.
 Anthony Ferro: Ferro is a former member of the C-Notes street gang and soldier of the Grand Avenue Street crew. He was sentenced to 6 years on state racketeering charges on January 8, 2001.
 John "Pudgy" Matassa: former captain and former secretary-treasurer of the Independent Union of Amalgamated Workers Local 711 and outfit soldier.
 Frank Caruso Jr.: son of 26th Street crew Capo Frank "Toots" Caruso was arrested for beating a black boy in 1998.
 Rick Rizzolo: Strip Club owner and Outfit soldier in Las Vegas.
 Gino "Mean Gene" Cassano: Elmwood Park soldier and brother of Dominick "Mennie" Cassano and Angelo "The Angel" Cassano (deceased). He and his brothers were convicted of attempted murder in 1993.
 Dominick "Mennie" Cassano: Elmwood Park soldier and brother of Gino "Mean Gene" Cassano and Angelo "The Angel" Cassano (deceased). He and his brothers were convicted of attempted murder in 1993.
 Dominic Buttitta: Outfit soldier, Strip Club owner  and father of fellow mobster Anthony Buttitta. They both where arrested by the FBI for an illegal internet gambling business.
 Anthony Buttitta: Outfit soldier and son of fellow mobster Dominic Buttitta. They both where arrested by the FBI for an illegal internet gambling business.
 Joseph Jerome "Jerry" Scalise: Outfit soldier, best known for stealing the Marlborough diamond. Currently incarcerated.
 Ricardo "Rick the Enforcer" Lentini: Outfit soldier and former right-hand man of Marco D’Amico.
 Paulie Carparelli: Cicero crew, debt collector and high-ranking member of Twelfth Street Players gang.
 Dino Marino: Son of Louis "Louie Tomatoes" Marino and driver of Solly D. He was arrested for a no show job as Health Department inspector for the Town of Cicero.
 Michael "A1 Mike" Zitello: Cicero soldier and bookmaker. He is a former protege of Louis "Louie Tomatoes" Marino.
 Carlo "The Fat Man/Carl D" Dote: Elmwood Park soldier, cafe owner and bookmaker.
 Andy Rovito: Outfit soldier was sentenced 5 years imprisonment for credit card fraud.
 Robert "The Gabeet" Bellavia: He and Rocco Infelice were indicted for the murder of bookie Hal C. Smith.
 Christopher "Christy the Nose" Spina: Spina is a member of the Grand Avenue Crew and a close associate of Albert Vena. He was also the driver Joey Lombardo and at one time he worked for Chicago's Bureau of Signs and Markings.
 Filippo "Gigi"  Rovito: Burr Ridge restaurant owner was sentenced to 6 years imprisonment for kidnapping and rape in 1997. He was hired by Mickey Davis to arange the beating of R.J. Serpico the owner of  Ideal Motors, a used-car dealership in Melrose Park. R.J. Serpico had a 300000$ debt by Salvatore DeLaurentis. The beating never happens because one of the man who Gigi has hired, George Brown was an FBI informant.

Associates
 Emil "Nick The Badge" Schullo: Former Cicero Police chief. He was convicted in 2002 in a federal racketeering case alongside Chicago Mafioso Michael (Big Mike) Spano and then-Cicero Mayor Betty Loren-Maltese. He awarded a contract to a security company owned by Spano.
 Michael "Mickey" Davis: Close associate of Salvatore DeLaurentis. In June 2015, he was found guilty of extortion and was sentenced to 4-years imprisonment.
 Paul Koroluk: joint  leader of the P-K street crew. The crew is named after the leaders Robert Panozzo Sr. and Koroluk. The P-K crew posed as police officers to rob drug houses on Chicago's south and west side. Koroluk is currently serving an 18-year prison sentence on RICO charges.

Former members 

 James "Jimmy I" Inendino – former underboss and capo of the Cicero Crew. According to sources, Inendino operated as captain of the Cicero crew since 2010. He died on February 23, 2023.

Government informants and witnesses
 Frank Cullotta – born in December 1938. He was a former associate and friend of Tony Spilotro, and was involved in his Hole in the Wall gang based in Las Vegas. In 1982, Cullotta was imprisoned and was approached by the FBI with a wiretap of Spilotro talking with someone about "having to clean our dirty laundry", which Cullotta took as an insinuated contract on his life. Due to this, in July 1982, Cullotta finalized an agreement with the prosecutors, sentenced to eight years in prison, but paroled in 1984 to the witness protection program. Cullotta died on August 20, 2020.
 Leonard Patrick – born in October 1913. Former associate heavily involved in illegal gambling rackets active in the North Side of Chicago. In June 1933, he was sentenced to 10 years in prison for robbing a bank in Culver, Indiana. He came to the attention of the U.S. Attorney in 1958 as a Chicago Outfit affiliate. In 1975, Patrick was convicted for contempt after he refused to testify under immunity against Chicago police lieutenant Ronald O'Hara and admitted to payoffs of $500 per month to O'Hara. Patrick was released in July 1978. He pleaded guilty to criminal charges in April 1992. It is alleged the Outfit ordered the bombing of Sharon Patrick's car outside her home in Rogers Park, Chicago in May 1992, as a result of his guilty plea. In September 1992, he testified against the Chicago Outfit. He is believed to have been involved, if not ordered, the 1965 assassination of 24th Ward Alderman Ben Lewis, the city's first black alderman and Democrat committeeman.  He died in 2006.
 Ken Eto – born in 1919. He was a former Japanese-American Chicago Outfit associate. He arrived in Chicago from Washington in 1949. Eto's criminal record dates back to 1942 for violating a wartime curfew. In February 1983, Eto survived an assassination attempt on his life by Outfit hitmen Jasper Campise and John Gattuso after 3 bullets ricocheted off of his skull, he immediately joined protective custody and turned informant against the Outfit, Outfit captain Vincent Solano ordered the attempt. The assassination attempt is believed to be revolved around paranoia towards Eto following his guilty plea on illegal gambling charges, which provoked the Chicago Outfit to believe the possibility of Eto being easily persuaded to cooperate with the government against the Outfit. The hitmen, 68-year-old Jasper Campise and 47-year-old John Gattuso were offered government protection and declined, they were both found strangled and stabbed in July 1983 inside of the trunk of a 1981 Volvo registered to Campise. The FBI estimated his criminal earnings of between "$150,000 to $200,000" per week and bribe payoffs of $12,000 per month to Chicago policemen. He died in January 2004 at the age of 84 from natural causes.
 Louis Bombacino – born in 1923. He was a former bookmaker. Between 1965 and 1967, Bombacino contacted the FBI while in prison awaiting trial on a robbery charge. He admitted to involvement in a large-scale bookmaking operation under the control of Jackie Cerone and Fiore Buccieri. He was murdered in Tempe, Arizona on the morning of October 6/7, 1975 by the Chicago Outfit while hiding under the alias "Joe Nardi", Paul Schiro and Tony Amadio were suspected in the car bombing. His testimony against Cerone resulted in 5 years' imprisonment in May 1970 and he relocated to Arizona and secured a warehouse job before his murder.
 Richard Cain – born in October 1931. He served as Chief Investigator for the Cook County Police Department. Cain joined the Chicago Police Department (Vice Squad) in 1956 until 1960. In June 1961, Cain was allegedly met by a CIA staffer in Mexico City, he was deported from Mexico in 1962 for carrying a loaded gun and brass knuckles, violating his tourist permit by working and impersonating a Mexican government official. He was released from prison in October 1971. On December 20, 1971, he was shot and killed on orders of the Chicago Outfit. Harry Aleman, Joey Lombardo and Frank Schweihs were suspected of killing him.
 Gerald Scarpelli – soldier (1988)
 William "B.J." Jahoda – former associate. He operated a sports bookmaking ring with Sam Sammarco between 1976 and 1979. Jahoda later began a partnership with Rocco Infelise in 1979 through to 1988, the operation allegedly earned over $8 million in profits. He operated an illegal parlay card business with Michael Sarno, James Damopoulos, Salvatore DeLaurentis and Infelise from 1979 to 1983 in Lake County, Illinois and other parts of Chicago. He also operated the Rouse House casino in suburban Libertyville, Illinois in 1982 which generated approximately $500,000 in profits, during this time he paid Infelise $1500 monthly payments to bribe the Lake County Sheriff to get advance notice of law enforcement raids. By the fall of 1988, Infelise told Jahoda that he was paying $10,000 to the Cook County Police Department Sheriff for protection and that he used undersheriff and former Cook County Republican Party chairman James Dvorak as the intermediate, Dvorak was sentenced to 3½ years in prison in April 1994 for accepting bribes. In September 1989, Infelise confirmed that he was paying $35,000 altogether to incarcerated Outfit members and Chicago police officers. In early 1990, the government alleged Infelise and Jahoda gave out a $50,000 loan to an undercover IRS agent under the identity of "Larry Weeks" who Infelise instructed to bribe a Wisconsin zoning official to gain favourable selection in their efforts to get commercial/industrial property near Lake Geneva, Wisconsin as residential property. He died in 2004.
 Nicholas Calabrese – born in November 1942. He is a former soldier in the Chicago Outfit. He was the brother of Frank Calabrese Sr. and uncle of Frank Calabrese Jr. and the star witness of the Family Secrets case. Calabrese was convicted for his involvement in 14 murders and sentenced to 12 years' imprisonment by District Judge James Zagel.
 Frank Calabrese Jr. – associate (2005)
 Jeff Hollingshead – associate (2014): Hollingshead was an associate of the Grand Avenue Crew and a member of the P-K street crew named after the leaders Robert Panozzo Sr. and Paul Koroluk. The P-K crew posed as police officers to rob drug houses on Chicago's south and west side.
 George Brown – associate (2016): Brown worked as a debt under Paul Carparelli. After he became an FBI informant he testified agains Mickey Davis and Paul Carparelli, that he was hired to broke both legs of the Melrose Park car dealer R.J. Serpico. His testimonial helped to arrest outfit members and associates: Robert McManus, Michael “Mickey” Davis, Mark Dziuban, Frank Orlando, Vito Iozzo, James Amabile and Paul Carparelli.  

The Outfit is notable for having had other ethnic groups besides Italians as high-ranking associates since the family's earliest days. A prime example of this was Jake "Greasy Thumb" Guzik, who was the top "bagman" and "accountant" for decades until his death. He was a Polish Jew. Others were Murray Humphreys, who was of Welsh descent, and Ken Eto (aka Tokyo Joe), who was Japanese-American.

Another well-known associate of the Outfit is Jewish New York City mobster Benjamin Siegel. Siegel was a childhood friend of Capone. Siegel's organization in Las Vegas and Los Angeles was an ally of the Outfit from 1933 to 1961 when the family boss, Mickey Cohen, was imprisoned and the family was decimated.

In popular culture
The Chicago Outfit has a long history of portrayal in Hollywood as the subject of film and television.

Film

 Little Caesar (1931)
 Scarface (1932)
 Chicago Syndicate (1955) 
 The Scarface Mob (television film, 1959)
 Al Capone (1959)
 The St. Valentine's Day Massacre (1967)
 Point Blank (1967)
 Bullitt (1968)
 The Outfit (1973)
 Capone (1975)
 Thief (1981)
 Raw Deal (1986)
 The Untouchables (1987)
 Midnight Run (1988)
 Next of Kin (1989)
 The Firm (1993)
 Casino (1995)
 Payback (1999)
 Road to Perdition (2002)
 Public Enemies (2009)
 Chicago Overcoat (2009)
 Gangster Land (2017)
 Capone (2020)
 The Outfit  (2022)

Television

 The Untouchables (1959–1963)
 The F.B.I. (1965–1974)
 Crime Story (1986–1988)
 The Untouchables (1993–1994)
 Sugartime (TV film) (1995)
 The Rat Pack (1998)
 Prison Break (2005–2009)
 The Chicago Code (2011)
 The Firm (2012)
 Mob Wives: Chicago (2012)
 The Mob Doctor (2012–2013)
 Boardwalk Empire (2010–2014)
 The Making of the Mob: Chicago (2016)

Anime
 91 Days (since 2016)
 baccano! (2007)

Books
 Scott, Sabrina Austen. The Lemon Tree Girl: A Mafia Story. Amazon, 2022. ISBN 979-8985541403

See also 
 Joe Aiello – rival to Al Capone during Prohibition; was also allied to Salvatore Maranzano during the Castellammarese War
 Grand Rapids Hotel
 Hired Truck Program scandal
 North Side Gang – a rival gang to Al Capone
 Timeline of organized crime in Chicago
 George "Babe" Tuffanelli
 Unione Siciliana
 Rocco Pranno

References

Citations

General references
 
 
 Cooley, Will (2017). "Jim Crow Organized Crime: Black Chicago's Underground Economy in the Twentieth Century", in Building the Black Metropolis: African American Entrepreneurship in Chicago, Robert Weems and Jason Chambers, eds. Urbana: University of Illinois Press, 147–170. .
  (Published for the traveling exhibition of Lombardi's work, Mark Lombardi Global Networks).

External links
  (Mob news archive)
  (Historical archives)

 
Organizations established in 1910
1910 establishments in Illinois
Organizations based in Chicago
Italian-American crime families
Gangs in Chicago
Italian-American culture in Chicago
Al Capone
The Untouchables